Luca Stefani (born 22 February 1987) is an Italian long track speed skater who participates in international competitions.

Personal records

Career highlights

European Allround Championships
2008 - Kolomna,  16th
World Junior Allround Championships
2004 - Roseville, Minnesota, 39th
2005 - Seinäjoki, 30th
2006 - Erfurt, 12th
National Championships
2007 - Baselga di Pinè,  3rd at allround
2008 - Baselga di Pinè,  3rd at allround
European Junior Games
2006 - Collalbo,  3rd at 3000 m

References

External links
 
 Stefani at Jakub Majerski's Speedskating Database
 Stefani at SkateResults.com

1987 births
Living people
Italian male speed skaters
Speed skaters at the 2010 Winter Olympics
Olympic speed skaters of Italy
Speed skaters of Fiamme Oro
Speed skaters at the 2007 Winter Universiade
Universiade medalists in speed skating
Universiade gold medalists for Italy
Medalists at the 2007 Winter Universiade
20th-century Italian people
21st-century Italian people